Sofia Gennadyevna Evdokimova (born 27 November 1996) is a retired Russian ice dancer. With her former partner, Egor Bazin, she is the 2017 Winter Universiade silver medalist, the 2018 Ice Star champion, and the 2019 Russian national bronze medalist.

Career

Early career 

Evdokimova teamed up with Egor Bazin in 2007. The duo debuted on the ISU Junior Grand Prix (JGP) series in the 2011–12 season, finishing seventh in Austria. In the 2013–14 season, they won their first JGP medal – bronze in Mexico.

2014–2015 season 
Evdokimova/Bazin started their season by competing in the 2014 JGP series. They placed fourth in both events, first at the JGP Czech Republic and then at the JGP Germany.

In 2014–15 season, Evdokimova/Bazin stepped onto the national podium for the first time, beating Alla Loboda / Pavel Drozd by 0.19 points for the bronze medal at the Russian Junior Championships. Based on this result, they were chosen to compete as Russia's third ice dancing team at the 2015 World Junior Championships in Tallinn, Estonia. Finishing tenth, Evdokimova/Bazin were the second best Russian duet after Anna Yanovskaya / Sergey Mozgov (gold), with Betina Popova / Yuri Vlasenko placing eleventh.

2015–2016 season 
In the 2015–16 season, Evdokimova/Bazin won their second JGP medal – bronze in Latvia. Two weeks later they placed fifth in JGP Austria. In October 2015 they won their first international gold medal at the 2015 Ice Star. In January 2016 they finished fourth at the 2016 Russian Junior Championships.

2016–2017 season 
In November 2016 Evdokimova/Bazin made their Grand Prix debut at the 2016 Rostelecom Cup where they placed ninth. A month later they skated their first Challenger event at the 2016 CS Golden Spin of Zagreb where they also placed ninth. In december they placed sixth at the 2017 Russian Championships. In February 2017 they competed at the 2017 Winter Universiade where they won the silver medal behind Oleksandra Nazarova / Maxim Nikitin.

2017–2018 season 
In November 2017 Evdokimova/Bazin skated at the 2017 CS Tallinn Trophy where they placed fourth. In Tallinn they were really close claiming their first Challenger series medal because they were less than 0.5 points behind the bronze medalists, Elliana Pogrebinsky / Alex Benoit. A month later Evdokimova/Bazin placed fifth at the 2018 Russian Championships.

2018–2019 season 
Evdokimova/Bazin started their season at the 2018 CS Finlandia Trophy where they finished seventh with a personal best score of 159.67 points. Two weeks later they won their first international senior gold medal at the 2018 Ice Star. In mid November they competed at the 2018 Rostelecom Cup where they finished fourth after placing sixth in the rhythm dance and fourth in the free dance. At this competition they also scored their personal best score 164.66 points. In late November they placed fourth at the 2018 CS Tallinn Trophy with a personal best score of 168.31 points.

At the 2019 Russian Championships, Evdokimova/Bazin placed fourth in the rhythm dance, around 3 points behind the third-place finishers Tiffany Zahorski / Jonathan Guerreiro and only half a point ahead of Anastasia Shpilevaya / Grigory Smirnov in fifth.  In the free dance, a disastrous skate by Zahorski/Guerreiro allowed them to take the bronze medal.  Bazin subsequently said that this had been their goal from the beginning of the season.  They competed at their first European Championships, placing ninth.

2019–2020 season 
Evdokimova/Bazin placed seventh at the 2019 CS Ondrej Nepela Memorial to begin the season.  Competing on the Grand Prix, they were ninth at the 2019 Skate Canada International and then sixth at the 2019 Cup of China.  At the 2020 Russian Championships, they placed seventh.

In March 2020, it was announced the two had ended their partnership.

On October 15, 2020, Evdokimova announced her retirement from competitive skating.

Programs 
(with Bazin)

Competitive highlights 
GP: Grand Prix; CS: Challenger Series; JGP: Junior Grand Prix

With Bazin

Detailed results 
Small medals for short and free programs awarded only at ISU Championships.

With Bazin

References

External links 

 

1996 births
Russian female ice dancers
Universiade medalists in figure skating
Living people
Sportspeople from Tolyatti
Universiade silver medalists for Russia
Competitors at the 2017 Winter Universiade
Competitors at the 2019 Winter Universiade